Lloyd Robinson may refer to:

 Lloyd Robinson (footballer) (1918–1967), Australian rules footballer
 Lloyd Robinson (cricketer) (1912–1996), Welsh cricketer